Mark Gregory Clayton (born April 8, 1961) is an American former professional football player who was a wide receiver with the Miami Dolphins for most of his career, entering the league in 1983 with the Dolphins and playing there until 1992. He finished out his career with the Green Bay Packers, playing a single season with them in 1993.

Early life
Clayton attended the University of Louisville, where he played wide receiver from 1979 to 1982. His best season was as a senior, when he made 53 catches for 1,112 yards and six touchdowns.

Career
Clayton started his career in 1983 on the bench, appearing sporadically on offense but working as the team’s primary punt returner. For the season he had six catches for 114 yards and one touchdown, while returning 60 punts for 392 yards and a touchdown. His first highlight game came on October 9 against the Buffalo Bills in a 38-35 loss; he had his first touchdown come through the air: in the third quarter, he threw a pass to Mark Duper that went 48 yards for a touchdown. In the following quarter, he would catch a 14-yard pass from Dan Marino for his first receiving touchdown.

He became a star in 1984. Playing in 15 games, he caught 73 passes for 1,389 yards for a league leading 18 touchdowns while garnering his first selection to the Pro Bowl. He made his first playoff appearance that year as the Dolphins coasted to a 14-2 record. His performance in Week 16 against the Dallas Cowboys earned him AFC Offensive Player of the Week honors. He caught just four passes for 150 yards, but three were for touchdowns, including the game winner in the fourth quarter. His eighteen touchdowns were the most by a receiver in one season until it was surpassed in 1987 by Jerry Rice; Clayton's 1984 mark is still tied for the third highest total in NFL history. In the Divisional Round game against the Seattle Seahawks, he caught five passes for 75 yards for a touchdown in the 31-10 win. The following week, he caught four passes for 95 yards and a score as they beat the Pittsburgh Steelers in the AFC Championship 45-28. In Super Bowl XIX, facing the San Francisco 49ers, he caught six passes for 92 yards, but the Dolphins failed to solve the stifling defense of the San Francisco 49ers in the 38-16 loss. Although Clayton appeared in twelve postseason games for a career, he caught just one more touchdown pass after 1984 (doing so in the 1990 Divisional Round game against Kansas City).

The following year showed marked differences for Clayton. He caught 70 passes for 996 yards while scoring four times. His yards per game went from 92.6 the previous year to 62.3 (which was his lowest in a season until 1990). At any rate, he was selected to the Pro Bowl once again. This proved the case again for 1986, when he played in 15 games while catching 60 passes for 1,150 yards while scoring ten times. He experienced slowdown in the following, marred by playing just 12 games (as he was on strike from week 3 to 6). He caught 46 passes for 776 yards while scoring seven times. He renewed himself in 1988, having a Pro Bowl year with a career high 86 passes for 1,129 yards while scoring a league-leading 14 touchdowns.

He had another 1,000 yard season while playing 15 games in 1989, scoring nine times on 64 catches for 1,011 yards. He regressed to his lowest totals in 1990 by playing 10 games with 32 catches for 406 yards for three scores. He did have one more revival with the 1991 season, catching 70 passes for 1,053 yards while scoring 12 times for a fifth and final Pro Bowl selection. He ended his Miami career the next year, playing 13 games while catching 43 passes for 619 yards with three touchdowns. He moved to the Green Bay Packers for his final season in 1993 and played in 16 games. He caught 32 passes for 331 yards for three touchdowns.

Clayton finished his 11-year career with 582 receptions for 8,974 yards, along with 108 rushing yards, 40 kickoff return yards, and 485 punt return yards. He also scored 86 total touchdowns (84 receiving, one passing, and one punt return)

Career Statistics

Regular season

Legacy
He is in the NFL top 50 in receiving yards (tied for 39th) and receiving TDs (tied for 13th). He holds Dolphins records for career pass receptions and TDs. A favorite target of Dan Marino, he paired with Mark Duper to form the popular "Marks Brothers", and they would play together for 10 years. At one point in time, the Dan Marino-Mark Clayton tandem was the most prolific in NFL history.

He is one of only three players in the history of the NFL who has caught a touchdown pass from both Dan Marino and Brett Favre during the NFL regular season. The others are Keith Jackson and Mark Ingram.

In 2003, he entered the Miami Dolphins Ring of Honor, along with fellow "Marks Brother", Mark Duper on December 15, 2003. On June 20, 2014, it was announced that Clayton would be inducted into the Kentucky Pro Football Hall of Fame.

In 2005, he helped punctuate Marino's Pro Football Hall of Fame induction speech by running through the crowd and catching one last pass from Marino thrown from the stage.

He now lives in Houston, Texas, with his sons Mark Gregory Clayton II and Matthew Clayton.

References

"Mark Gregory Clayton". Marquis Who's Who TM. Marquis Who's Who, 2004.
Reproduced in Biography Resource Center. Farmington Hills, Mich.: Thomson Gale. 2005.

External links
Career Stats

1961 births
American Conference Pro Bowl players
American football wide receivers
Green Bay Packers players
Living people
Louisville Cardinals football players
Miami Dolphins players
Players of American football from Indianapolis
African-American players of American football
21st-century African-American people
20th-century African-American sportspeople